Horn in the West, by Kermit Hunter, is an outdoor drama produced every summer since 1952 in the Daniel Boone Amphitheater in Boone, North Carolina. The show, the oldest revolutionary war drama in the United States, was about the life and times of the hardy mountain settlers of western North Carolina and eastern Tennessee. It covers a time period during the American Revolution between the Battle of Alamance in 1771 and the Battle of King's Mountain in 1780. The story follows the family of Dr. Geoffrey Stuart, a British loyalist, who is forced to flee the lower colony due to the actions of his son during the Battle of Alamance. Led into the mountain country by frontiersman Daniel Boone, Stuart must come to terms with his own loyalties, which are divided between his country and his son.

There have been hundreds of cast members in the show's long history, the four roles most often noted are those of Dr. Geoffrey Stuart, Daniel Boone, Jack Stuart, and Rev. Isaiah Sims, an itinerant Baptist circuit-riding preacher who befriends Stuart during his time in the mountains. Dr. Stuart has been portrayed by a great many actors over the years. William Ross originated the role of Dr. Stuart. James Maddux acted the role for several years; as did Mark Allen Woodard, who portrayed Dr. Stuart from 2003 until 2007; Andrew Dylan Ray, who portrayed the Doctor from 2008 to 2011; Ryan Gentry, who held the role in 2012 and 2013, J. J. McCarson in 2014, and Jake Duvall-Early. The original performer cast as Daniel Boone in the show was Ned Austin. He was followed by Glenn Causey, who donned Boone's "coon-skin cap" for forty-one years until shortly before his death (and is still commonly associated with the role in the Boone area); Wesley Martin, who assumed the role of the rugged frontiersman from 1998 until 2011; Joseph Watson in 2012 and 2013; Jon Mark Bowman; and Scott Loveless in 2018 and 2021. 

The role of Preacher Sims was written into the show in 1956 for Charles C. Elledge, an original cast member, who went on to portray Rev. Sims until 1983. After Mr. Elledge left the role shortly before his death, the role went through a succession of actors, including Jerry Vencill, Ricky Joe Jessup, Doug Williams, and Darrell King, who performed in the role for over twenty years. For 2014, the role has been passed to Bradley Archer. Darrell King reprised the role in 2019. For the 2023 season, the 71st season of Horn in the West, Darrell King is taking the role of Artistic Director.

The show's original Daniel Boone, Ned Austin, met his wife, Roberta, in the first season of the show. She was in the cast of the 1952 production. The following year their son David joined the cast, aged three weeks. Austin died in February, 2007.

Throughout the history of Horn in the West there have been multiple more minor roles, both based on real historical figures like Judge Richard Henderson and fictional characters like Martha Stuart. Lillian North has been cast as Martha Stuart since 2021.

The show also features a presence of historical Cherokee figures, most notably in a scene taking place in 'Cherokee Country'. Nancy Ward, Dragging Canoe, and Attakullakulla have all been present in different iterations of the script. Dragging Canoe was portrayed by Ian Lee in 2022.

Horn in the West has become a summer tradition in the North Carolina Appalachian region. Kai Jurgensen was the first artistic director of the show, followed by George McCalmon, Edgar Loessin, William Ross, David French, Gene Wilson, Ward Haarbauer, and Richard Ayers. Ed Pilkington took over as Artistic Director in 1971 and directed until 1991. Succeeding directors have included A. Lynn Lockrow, Dewey "Bud" Mayes, Michael Schialabba, and Cherie Elledge-Grapes, daughter of Charlie (Rev. Sims) Elledge. From 2008 to 2013, Julie A. Richardson took the reins of the show, and for the 2014 season, the duties of Director had been assumed by Teresa Lee, who left after the 2016 season. Chris Bellinger directed in 2017 and Britton Corry took over in 2018 and 2019. Darrell King, a long-standing cast member, takes over for the 2023 season.

Traditionally beginning in mid-June and ending in mid-August, the Horn observed its 68th consecutive production season in the summer of 2019.  Horn in the West (and the Daniel Boone Amphitheater) shares a 35-acre (140,000 m2) park in the center of the town of Boone with Hickory Ridge History Museum and the Daniel Boone Native Gardens.

The show did not have its 69th season in 2020 due to the COVID-19 Pandemic, but has returned for 2021. The cast and crew are excited to bring another season of the Revolutionary Drama to guests for the 71st season in 2023.

Auditions for the 2023 Season take place February 25th in Boone, North Carolina for aspiring actors, seasoned pros, and technicians.

External links 
 Official Web Site
 Member, Institute of Outdoor Theatre

Tourist attractions in Watauga County, North Carolina
Theatre in North Carolina
Boone, North Carolina
Cultural depictions of Daniel Boone